Stipan 'Steve' Srhoy (born 1940) is a former Australian international lawn bowler and coach.

Bowls career
He won a silver medal in the fours with Ian Taylor, Robert Ball and Stephen Anderson at the 1994 Commonwealth Games in Victoria.

He coached the 2002 Commonwealth Games Australian bowls team.

He won two medals at the 1993 Asia Pacific Bowls Championships including a gold medal in the fours, in Victoria, Canada.

References

1940 births
Australian male bowls players
Living people
Commonwealth Games medallists in lawn bowls
Commonwealth Games silver medallists for Australia
Bowls players at the 1994 Commonwealth Games
Medallists at the 1994 Commonwealth Games